Jodhpur District is a district in the State of Rajasthan in western India. The city of Jodhpur is the administrative headquarters of the district.

As of the 2011 census, it is the second highest populated district of Rajasthan (out of 33), after Jaipur district.

Jodhpur is the historic center of the Marwar region. The district contains Mandore, the ancient capital of the Pratihara Rajput kings (6th-13th centuries), and the Pratiharas' temple city of Osiyan. Jodhpur was founded in the 15th century by Rao Jodha, and served as the capital of the kingdom of Marwar under the Rathore dynasty until after Indian Independence in 1947.

Geography
The district is located in the State of Rajasthan in western India. [The district is bounded on the north by Bikaner District, on the northeast by Nagaur District, on the southeast and south by Pali District, on the southwest by Barmer District, and on the west and northwest by Jaisalmer District.  The district stretches between 26 00’ and 27 37’ north latitude and between 72 55’ and 73 52’ east longitude. This district is situated at an altitude between 250 and 300 meters above sea level.

Jodhpur district comprises three distinct physiography units, the alluvial plains, sand dunes and escarpments. The western and north-western parts of Jodhpur district are characterised by sand dunes. With exception of some parts of Bilara and Osian tehsil, land surface of the district is nearly flat and sandy.  Luni is the only important river in the district, it  enters Jodhpur district near Bilara and flows for a distance of over 75 km. before entering in Barmer district.

Economy

Tourism
Jodhpur is famous for its rich history. It is also referred to as the Blue City and "Sun City". Blue City is derived due to the blue tinge to the whitewashed houses around the Mehrangarh Fort. Other notable places of interest are the Umaid Bhawan Palace which a portion currently serves as the residence of the current Maharaja  Gaj Singh's family and the remaining portion is a 5 star hotel under the  Taj Group of Hotels.

Divisions
In the 2001 census, there were five sub-divisions in the district and seven tehsils. For ease of administration, there were four sub-tehsils (Upa-tehsils): Balesar, Bap, Jhanwar and Tinwari. Balesar and Bap has local councils (panchayat samiti).

As of 2011, there were seven sub-divisions in the district and eleven tehsils. In addition to these, there were two independent sub-tehsils (Upa-tehsils): Jhanwar and Tinwari.

All tehsils are development blocks and have panchayat samities, except Jodhpur which is an urban agglomeration governed as a Municipal Corporation. The towns of Bilara, Phalodi and Piparcity are governed by Municipal Councils. There are 1,794 villages under 351 Gram Panchayats.

Villages
 

Birawas
Khejarla
Lolawas
Pichiyak
Sambariya

Demographics

According to the 2011 census Jodhpur district has a population of 3,687,165, roughly equal to the nation of Liberia or the US state of Oklahoma. This gives it a ranking of 73rd in India (out of a total of 640). Its population growth rate over the decade 2001-2011 was 27.69%. Jodhpur has a sex ratio of 915 females for every 1000 males, and a literacy rate of 67.09%. 34.30% of the population lives in urban areas. Scheduled Castes and Scheduled Tribes make up 16.49% and 3.23% of the population respectively.

Languages 

At the time of the 2011 census, 80.22% of the population spoke Rajasthani, 8.87% Marwari and 8.61% Hindi as their first language.

Notable people
 Vijaydan Detha, writer and folklorist. Born in Borunda (Bilara tahsil).
 Om Thanvi (born 1957) Writer and editor. Born in Phalodi.
 Justice Devendra Kachhawaha, Judge, Rajasthan High Court, Jodhpur
 Abhishek Manu Singhvi, well known lawyer and Politician
 Barkatullah Khan (1920–73) Politician. Born in Jodhpur.
 Ashwini Vaishnaw, Politician, former IAS officer & currently the Minister of Railways, Communications and Electronics & IT.
 Parasram Maderna (1926–2014) Politician and Jat leader.
 Jai Narayan Vyas (1899–1963) 3rd CM of Rajasthan.
 Narayan Singh Manaklao (born 1942) Social worker.
 Ashok Gehlot (born 1951) 12th CM of Rajasthan.
 Chitrangada Singh (born 1976) Bollywood Actress.
 Shailesh Lodha, Indian poet, actor, comedian and writer
 Mehdi Hassan (1927–2012) Pakistani Ghazal Singer
 Jaswant Singh Bishnoi
 Narayan Singh Bhati
 Gajendra Singh Shekhawat, politician.
 Narayan Lal Panchariya
 Kamsa Meghwal
 Narayan Singh Manaklao
 Mathura Das Mathur
 Sheo Dan Mal
 Gajendra Singh Khimsar

See also
 Central Arid Zone Research Institute
 Arid Forest Research Institute

References

 Jodhpur district Official website
 Jodhpur district
 Jodhpur Map

External links

 
 Official Website of Jodhpur District

 
Districts of Rajasthan
Districts in Jodhpur division

mr:जोधपुर